Aatish Bhalaik (born 5 December 1991, Shimla, Himachal Pradesh) is an Indian first-class cricketer who plays for Himachal Pradesh.

References

External links
 
 cricketarchive

1995 births
Living people
Indian cricketers
Himachal Pradesh cricketers
People from Shimla
Cricketers from Himachal Pradesh
Wicket-keepers